Mont Pelat (3,050m), is a mountain of the Maritime Alps located in the chain of mountains between the high valley of Verdon to the west, the high valley of Var to the east and the Bachelard valley in the North. Located in the department of Alpes-de-Haute-Provence, it is the namesake of the Pelat Massif. The summit is located in the central area of the Mercantour National Park. It is known as being one of the easiest of the 3,000m Alpine peaks to climb.

The normal access route is through the valley of Pelat, located southeast of the summit and accessible both from Lake Allos and from the Col de la Cayolle. The path presents no particular difficulty. On the summit, the view stretches from the Montagne Sainte-Victoire in the south to Mont Blanc in the north.

References

1.  ↑ Bénédicte Fénié, Jean-Jacques Fénié Provençal Toponymy, Southwest Publishing, 2002 (reprint), p.  80 
2.  ↑ Pages 4 and 5 in "Explanatory Note" of the geological map 1:50 000 ALLOS XXXV-40 published by the Bureau of Geological and Mining Research, Berger-Levrault, Nancy, 728720-9-1968 
3.  ↑ Definitions SOIUSA 
Mountain Gate  Mountain Gate

Mountains of the Alps
Alpine three-thousanders
Mountains of Alpes-de-Haute-Provence